Sandro Schwarz (born 17 October 1978) is a German football manager and a former player. He is the head coach at Hertha BSC.

Coaching career
On 14 October 2020, he was hired as manager by the Russian Premier League club FC Dynamo Moscow. Schwarz was invited to Dynamo by their director of sports Željko Buvač. Buvač worked as an assistant manager to Jürgen Klopp at Mainz 05 for 3 seasons when Schwarz played for the club. Schwarz formally lost his first match as head coach to CSKA Moscow, but he did not personally arrive in Moscow by the time of that game due to paperwork delays related to the COVID-19 pandemic in Russia, and the game was managed by Alyaksandr Kulchy in his stead. After actually arriving to Russia, he started his time with Dynamo with three consecutive victories, including a 5–1 derby victory over FC Lokomotiv Moscow. In the next 5 games, Dynamo won only once and lost 3 times before the season was paused for the winter break.

In April 2021, reports appeared in the German media about the possible invitation of Schwarz to Eintracht Frankfurt instead of the outgoing Adi Hütter. In response, Schwarz said that he was completely focused on Dynamo, and the spread of rumors in the sports media is an “integral part of football”.

Dynamo finished Schwarz's first season in charge in 7th place, failing to qualify for UEFA competitions, despite gaining 50 points (most since the 2014–15 season).

In the 2021–22 season, Dynamo won 4 out of their first 5 games and took the top spot in the standings. He was chosen as league's coach of the month for the games played in July and August, and once again for September. When the regular Russian season's 2.5-months winter break started in December 2021, Dynamo was in second place, two points behind the league-leading Zenit. That was the highest position Dynamo took into the winter break since RPL switched to fall-to-spring schedule in the 2011–12 season. 36 points that Dynamo gained in 18 games played up to that point was the highest for the club since the 1996 season. On 15 December 2021, Schwarz extended his contract with Dynamo until the end of the 2023–24 season. He was chosen as league's coach of the month again for November-December 2021. Dynamo remained in second place in the league for most of the season before some late Dynamo losses allowed Zenit to secure the title with three games left to play in the season. The club also qualified for the 2021–22 Russian Cup final, their first Russian Cup final appearance since 2012. On the last matchday of the league season on 21 May 2022, Dynamo lost 1–5 at home to PFC Sochi and dropped to 3rd place, letting Sochi overtake them, as Dynamo only gained 1 point in last 5 league games of the season. Still, that was the first Top-3 finish for Dynamo since 2008. On 29 May 2022, Dynamo lost the Russian Cup final to Spartak 1–2, with Daniil Fomin missing the penalty kick deep in added time. Schwarz resigned from Dynamo following the final. 

In June 2022, he joined Hertha BSC, signing a contract until 2024.

Career statistics

Managerial record

References

1978 births
Living people
German footballers
1. FSV Mainz 05 players
Rot-Weiss Essen players
SV Wehen Wiesbaden players
2. Bundesliga players
2. Bundesliga managers
3. Liga managers
Association football midfielders
German football managers
1. FSV Mainz 05 managers
Bundesliga managers
Sportspeople from Mainz
1. FSV Mainz 05 II managers
Footballers from Rhineland-Palatinate
SV Wehen Wiesbaden managers
FC Dynamo Moscow managers
Russian Premier League managers
Hertha BSC managers
German expatriate football managers
Expatriate football managers in Russia
German expatriate sportspeople in Russia